Magnesium citrate is a magnesium preparation in salt form with citric acid in a 1:1 ratio (1 magnesium atom per citrate molecule).  The name "magnesium citrate" is ambiguous and sometimes may refer to other salts such as trimagnesium citrate which has a magnesium:citrate ratio of 3:2.

Magnesium citrate is used medicinally as a saline laxative and to completely empty the bowel prior to a major surgery or colonoscopy. It is available without a prescription, both as a generic and under various brand names. It is also used in the pill form as a magnesium dietary supplement. It contains 11.23% magnesium by weight. Compared to trimagnesium citrate, it is much more water-soluble, less alkaline, and contains less magnesium.

As a food additive, magnesium citrate is used to regulate acidity and is known as E number E345.

Mechanism of action 
Magnesium citrate works by attracting water through the tissues by a process known as osmosis. Once in the intestine, it can attract enough water into the intestine to induce defecation. The additional water stimulates bowel motility. This means it can also be used to treat rectal and colon problems. Magnesium citrate functions best on an empty stomach, and should always be followed with a full (eight ounce or 250 ml) glass of water or juice to help counteract water loss and aid in absorption. Magnesium citrate solutions generally produce bowel movement in one-half to three hours.

Use and dosage 
The maximum upper tolerance limit (UTL) for magnesium in supplement form for adults is 350 mg of elemental magnesium per day, according to the National Institutes of Health (NIH). In addition, according to the NIH, total dietary requirements for magnesium from all sources (in other words, food and supplements) is 320–420 mg of elemental magnesium per day, though there is no UT for dietary magnesium.

Laxative
Magnesium citrate is used as a laxative agent.

Consuming an adult dose of 10 oz of laxative syrup (@ 1.745 g/oz) implies a consumption of 17.45 g of magnesium citrate in a single  dose resulting in a consumption of approximately 2.0 g of elemental magnesium per single dose. This laxative dose contains five times the recommended nutritional dose for children. Magnesium citrate is not recommended for use in children and infants two years of age or less.

Magnesium deficiency treatment
Although less common, as a magnesium supplement the citrate form is sometimes used because it is believed to be more bioavailable than other common pill forms, such as magnesium oxide. But, according to one study, magnesium gluconate was found to be marginally more bioavailable than even magnesium citrate.

Potassium-magnesium citrate, as a supplement in pill form, is useful for the prevention of kidney stones.

Side effects 
Magnesium citrate is generally not a harmful substance, but care should be taken by consulting a healthcare professional if any adverse health problems are suspected or experienced. Extreme magnesium overdose can result in serious complications such as slow heart beat, low blood pressure, nausea, drowsiness, etc. If severe enough, an overdose can even result in coma or death. However, a moderate overdose will be excreted through the kidneys, unless one has serious kidney problems.  Rectal bleeding or failure to have a bowel movement after use could be signs of a serious condition.

See also 
 ATC code A12
 Magnesium aspartate

References

External links 
 Saline laxatives. MedicineNet.
 Magnesium citrate Patient Advice. Drugs.com.

Citrates
Laxatives
Magnesium compounds
Antiarrhythmic agents
Antidepressants
Diuretics
Sedatives
Food additives
Hypnotics
Antispasmodics
Tocolytics
Psycholeptics